Gnamptogenys coxalis is a species of ant of the subfamily Ectatomminae, which can be found from Borneo, Sri Lanka, India, and Nicobar Islands.

References

External links

 at antwiki.org
Animaldiversity.org
Itis.org

Ectatomminae
Hymenoptera of Asia
Insects described in 1860